The HTB network consists of churches planted by Holy Trinity Brompton (HTB) or by HTB plants themselves. As such, it is a network of Anglican churches within the Church of England and the Church in Wales that are linked back to HTB.

The network now comprises more than 30 of the approximately 490 churches in the Diocese of London, and 66 churches nationwide across 17 dioceses. In recent years the Church Commissioners have released tens of millions of pounds of funding to help HTB plants revitalise strategic churches.

List of church plants

This list is mostly drawn from the HTB website. Numbers refer to the maps below.

Maps

London

England & Wales

Notes

References

External links
 HTB - Related Churches & Church Plants
Church Army research on early HTB plants

 
Church of England societies and organisations